Charlott Cordes (born 6 December 1988)  is a German fashion model from Hamburg, Germany. She was co-winner (along with Jeanna Krichel) of the Elite Model Look 2003 in Germany. Cordes placed among the top five at the international final of the contest in Singapore.  She was nominated for the German "New Faces Award 2005." In 2004 she modelled in fashion shows for Prada, Jil Sander, and Calvin Klein. She resides in Hamburg, Milan, Italy, New York City, and Barcelona, Spain. Her height is 5'9.5" (177 cm). She has blonde hair and green eyes.

Cordes has appeared on the cover of the Russian language version of Vogue which was photographed by Karl Lagerfeld
in April 2005. The same month she participated in advertising for Chanel. The following August
Walter Chin captured her image for the 25th anniversary jubilee issue of German Vogue. Cordes was photographed by Carter Smith for
American Teen Vogue and also appeared in Harper's Bazaar. Her advertising campaigns include work for Nivea, DKNY, Laurel, Rena Lange, Moschino, BGN, Fornarina, Tommy Hilfiger, Chanel, Givenchy, DeBeers, and Benetton.

She is represented by Model Management (Hamburg), Elite Model Management, Elite Paris, Elite Milan, Select (London, England), and Elite Barcelona.

References

External links

Charlott Cordes at Vogue.de Models
Charlott Cordes at One Thousand Models.com

1988 births
German female models
Living people